The Hollywood Music in Media Award for Best Main Title Theme – TV Show/Limited Series is one of the awards given annually to composers working in the television industry by the Hollywood Music in Media Awards (HMMA). It is presented to the songwriters who have composed the best "original" song, written specifically for an animated film. The award was first given in 2014, during the fifth annual awards.

Winners and nominees

2010s
Best Main Title Theme – TV Show/Digital Streaming SeriesBest Main Title Theme –TV Show/Limited Series'''

2020s

References

Awards established in 2014